Minuscule 195 (in the Gregory-Aland numbering), A131 (Soden), is a Greek minuscule manuscript of the New Testament, on parchment. Paleographically it has been assigned to the 11th century. It has complex contents and marginalia.

Description 

The codex contains a complete text of the four Gospels on 277 thick parchment leaves (size ). The text is written in one column per page, biblical text in 25 lines per page, text of commentary in 50 lines per page, in brown ink.

There is also a division according to the Ammonian Sections (in Mark 233 Sections), with references to the Eusebian Canons (written below Ammonian Section numbers).

The commentary to the Gospel of Mark is of authorship of Victorinus of Pettau.

Text 

The Greek text of the codex is a representative of the Byzantine text-type. Aland placed it in Category V.
It was not examined by Claremont Profile Method.

History 

"The date of the year is lost, but the month (May) and indication (8) remain." It once belonged to the Cistercian convent of St. Salvator de Septimo.

It was examined by Birch, Scholz, and Burgon. C. R. Gregory saw it in 1886.

It is currently housed at the Laurentian Library (Plutei. VI. 34), at Florence.

See also 

 List of New Testament minuscules
 Biblical manuscript
 Textual criticism

References

Further reading 

 

Greek New Testament minuscules
11th-century biblical manuscripts